In molecular biology mir-632 microRNA is a short RNA molecule. MicroRNAs function to regulate the expression levels of other genes by several mechanisms.

miR-632 and MDS
miR-632 has been identified as one of three key miRNAs associated with the anti-ageing myelodysplastic syndromes (MDS). In particular, its levels show high discrimination between MDS and normal controls, and expression is decreased in MDS. In this way it can be used as a potential diagnostic marker for MDS.

DNAJB6 protein
miR-632 targets the coding region of the DNAJB6 protein, a member of the Heat Shock Protein 40 (HSP40) family which shows constitutive expression. DNAJB6 is known to be a negative regulator of tumour progression in breast cancer and its levels are compromised in advanced tumour progression. miR-632 has been linked to be downregulation of DNAJB6 and is capable of silencing both spliced variants of this protein. It is currently unknown whether miR-632 may be just one of many negative regulators controlling DNAJB6 levels.

See also 
 MicroRNA

References

External links
 

MicroRNA
MicroRNA precursor families